The 61st Annual Grammy Awards ceremony was held on February 10, 2019, at the Staples Center in Los Angeles. Singer-songwriter Alicia Keys hosted. During her opening monologue, Keys brought out Lady Gaga, Jada Pinkett Smith, Jennifer Lopez, and former First Lady of the United States Michelle Obama, each of whom spoke about the impact that music had on their lives.

The ceremony recognized the best recordings, compositions, and artists of the eligibility year, which ran from October 1, 2017, to September 30, 2018. Nominations were announced on December 7, 2018.

Dolly Parton was honored as the MusiCares Person of the Year two days prior to the Grammy Awards on February 8, 2019.

Kendrick Lamar received the most nominations, with eight. Childish Gambino and Kacey Musgraves tied for the most wins of the night with four each. Childish Gambino did not attend the Grammys and became the first major award winner to be absent from the ceremony since Amy Winehouse in 2008. "This Is America" producer Ludwig Göransson and recording engineer Riley Mackin accepted the Record of the Year Grammy on behalf of Childish Gambino.

Nominations announcement
Nominations were to be announced on December 5, 2018, but were delayed to Friday, December 7, 2018 following the death and state funeral of former President George H.W. Bush.

Performers

Presenters 

 Devin McCourty and Julian Edelman – presented Best Pop Duo/Group Performance
 Nina Dobrev – introduced Kacey Musgraves
 Alicia Keys and John Mayer – presented Song of the Year
 Anna Kendrick – introduced Kacey Musgraves, Katy Perry, Miley Cyrus, Little Big Town, Maren Morris, and Dolly Parton
 Alicia Keys – introduced Shawn Mendes and Miley Cyrus
 Kane Brown, Meghan Trainor, Luke Combs – presented Best Country Album
 Dan + Shay – presented Best Rap Song
 Alicia Keys – introduced Post Malone and Red Hot Chili Peppers
 Raif-Henok Emmanuel Kendrick – introduced Diana Ross
 Alicia Keys – introduced Lady Gaga
 Eve and Swizz Beatz – introduced Travis Scott, James Blake, and Philip Bailey
 Alicia Keys and Smokey Robinson – introduced Jennifer Lopez, Smokey Robinson, and Ne-Yo
 BTS – presented Best R&B Album
 Kelsea Ballerini – introduced Brandi Carlile
 Leon Bridges and Charlie Wilson – introduced Chloe x Halle
 Chloe x Halle – presented Best Rap Album
 Wilmer Valderrama – introduced St. Vincent and Dua Lipa
 Alessia Cara and Bob Newhart – presented Best New Artist
 Jimmy Jam – introduced outgoing President of the Recording Academy Neil Portnow
 Neil Portnow – introduced in memoriam montage
 Alicia Keys – announced Producer of the Year, Non-Classical and Best Engineered Album, Non-Classical
 Alicia Keys – presented Record of the Year and Album of the Year

Premiere ceremony
Listed in no particular order.

Shaggy
Lzzy Hale of Halestorm
Kalani Pe'a
Questlove
Cécile McLorin Salvant
Tokimonsta
Jimmy Jam

Nominations and winners
Winners are highlighted in Bold

General

Record of the Year
"This Is America" – Childish Gambino
Donald Glover & Ludwig Göransson, producers; Derek "MixedByAli" Ali, Riley Mackin & Shaan Singh, engineers/mixers; Mike Bozzi, mastering engineer
"I Like It" – Cardi B, Bad Bunny & J Balvin
 Invincible, J. White Did It, Craig Kallman & Tainy, producers; Leslie Brathwaite, Kuk Harrell , Evan LaRay & Simone Torres, engineers/mixers; Colin Leonard, mastering engineer
"The Joke" – Brandi Carlile
Dave Cobb & Shooter Jennings, producers; Tom Elmhirst & Eddie Spear, engineers/mixers; Pete Lyman, mastering engineer
"God's Plan" – Drake
Boi-1Da, Cardo & Young Exclusive, producers; Noel Cadastre, Noel "Gadget" Campbell & Noah Shebib, engineers/mixers; Chris Athens, mastering engineer
"Shallow" – Lady Gaga & Bradley Cooper
Lady Gaga & Benjamin Rice, producers; Brandon Bost & Tom Elmhirst, engineers/mixers; Randy Merrill, mastering engineer
"All the Stars" – Kendrick Lamar & SZA
Al Shux & Sounwave, producers; Sam Ricci & Matt Schaeffer, engineers/mixers; Mike Bozzi, mastering engineer
"Rockstar" – Post Malone featuring 21 Savage
Louis Bell & Tank God, producers; Louis Bell, Lorenzo Cardona, Manny Marroquin & Ethan Stevens, engineers/mixers; Mike Bozzi, mastering engineer
"The Middle" – Zedd, Maren Morris and Grey
Grey, Monsters & Strangerz & Zedd, producers; Grey, Tom Morris, Ryan Shanahan & Zedd, engineers/mixers; Mike Marsh, mastering engineer

Album of the Year
Golden Hour – Kacey Musgraves
 Ian Fitchuk, Kacey Musgraves & Daniel Tashian, producers; Craig Alvin & Shawn Everett, engineers/mixers; Ian Fitchuk, Kacey Musgraves & Daniel Tashian, songwriters; Greg Calbi & Steve Fallone, mastering engineers
 Invasion of Privacy – Cardi B
 Leslie Brathwaite & Evan LaRay, engineers/mixers; Belcalis Almanzar & Jorden Thorpe, songwriters; Colin Leonard, mastering engineer
 By the Way, I Forgive You – Brandi Carlile
 Dave Cobb & Shooter Jennings, producers; Dave Cobb & Eddie Spear, engineers/mixers; Brandi Carlile, Phil Hanseroth & Tim Hanseroth, songwriters; Pete Lyman, mastering engineer
 Scorpion – Drake
 Noel Cadastre, Noel "Gadget" Campbell & Noah Shebib, engineers/mixers; Aubrey Graham & Noah Shebib, songwriters; Chris Athens, mastering engineer
 H.E.R. – H.E.R.
 Darhyl "Hey DJ" Camper Jr., David "Swagg R'Celious" Harris, H.E.R., Walter Jones & Jeff Robinson, producers; Miki Tsutsumi, engineer/mixer; Darhyl Camper Jr. & H.E.R., songwriters; Dave Kutch, mastering engineer
 Beerbongs & Bentleys – Post Malone
 Louis Bell & Post Malone, producers; Louis Bell & Manny Marroquin, engineers/mixers; Louis Bell & Austin Post, songwriters; Mike Bozzi, mastering engineer
 Dirty Computer – Janelle Monáe
 Chuck Lightning, Janelle Monáe Robinson & Nate "Rocket" Wonder, producers; Mick Guzauski, Janelle Monáe Robinson & Nate "Rocket" Wonder, engineers/mixers; Nathaniel Irvin III, Charles Joseph II, Taylor Parks & Janelle Monáe Robinson, songwriters; Chris Gehringer, mastering engineer
 Black Panther: The Album, Music From and Inspired By – (Various Artists)
 Kendrick Lamar, featured artist; Kendrick Duckworth & Sounwave, producers; Matt Schaeffer, engineer/mixer; Kendrick Duckworth & Mark Spears, songwriters; Mike Bozzi, mastering engineer

Song of the Year
"This Is America"
Donald Glover, Ludwig Göransson & Jeffrey Lamar Williams, songwriters (Childish Gambino)
"All the Stars"
Kendrick Duckworth, Solána Rowe, Al Shuckburgh, Mark Spears & Anthony Tiffith, songwriters (Kendrick Lamar & SZA)
"Boo'd Up"
Larrance Dopson, Joelle James, Ella Mai & Dijon McFarlane, songwriters (Ella Mai)
"God's Plan"
Aubrey Graham, Daveon Jackson, Brock Korsan, Ron LaTour, Matthew Samuels & Noah Shebib, songwriters (Drake)
"In My Blood"
Teddy Geiger, Scott Harris, Shawn Mendes & Geoffrey Warburton, songwriters (Shawn Mendes)
"The Joke"
Brandi Carlile, Dave Cobb, Phil Hanseroth & Tim Hanseroth, songwriters (Brandi Carlile)
"The Middle"
Sarah Aarons, Jordan K. Johnson, Stefan Johnson, Marcus Lomax, Kyle Trewartha, Michael Trewartha & Anton Zaslavski, songwriters (Zedd, Maren Morris & Grey)
"Shallow" 
Lady Gaga, Mark Ronson, Anthony Rossomando & Andrew Wyatt, songwriters (Lady Gaga & Bradley Cooper)

Best New Artist
Dua Lipa
 Chloe x Halle
 Luke Combs
 Greta Van Fleet
 H.E.R.
 Margo Price
 Bebe Rexha
 Jorja Smith

Pop
Best Pop Solo Performance
 "Joanne (Where Do You Think You're Goin'?)" – Lady Gaga
 "Colors" – Beck
 "Havana" (Live) – Camila Cabello
 "God Is a Woman" – Ariana Grande
 "Better Now" – Post Malone

Best Pop Duo/Group Performance
 "Shallow" – Lady Gaga & Bradley Cooper
 "Fall in Line" – Christina Aguilera  featuring Demi Lovato
 "Don't Go Breaking My Heart" – Backstreet Boys
 "'S Wonderful" – Tony Bennett & Diana Krall
 "Girls Like You" – Maroon 5 featuring Cardi B
 "Say Something" – Justin Timberlake featuring Chris Stapleton
 "The Middle" – Zedd, Maren Morris and Grey

Best Traditional Pop Vocal Album
 My Way – Willie Nelson Love Is Here to Stay – Tony Bennett & Diana Krall
 Nat King Cole & Me – Gregory Porter
 Standards (Deluxe) – Seal
 The Music...The Mem'ries...The Magic! – Barbra Streisand

Best Pop Vocal Album
 Sweetener – Ariana Grande Camila – Camila Cabello
 Meaning of Life – Kelly Clarkson
 Shawn Mendes – Shawn Mendes
 Beautiful Trauma – P!nk
 Reputation – Taylor Swift

Dance/Electronic Music
Best Dance Recording"Electricity" – Silk City & Dua Lipa featuring Diplo & Mark RonsonJarami, Alex Metric, Riton & Silk City, producers; Josh Gudwin, mixer"Northern Soul" – Above & Beyond featuring Richard Bedford
Above & Beyond & Andrew Bayer, producers; Above & Beyond, mixers
"Ultimatum" – Disclosure featuring Fatoumata Diawara
Guy Lawrence & Howard Lawrence, producers; Guy Lawrence, mixer
"Losing It" – Fisher
Paul Nicholas Fisher, producer; Kevin Grainger, mixer
"Ghost Voices" – Virtual Self
Porter Robinson, producer; Porter Robinson, mixer

Best Dance/Electronic AlbumWoman Worldwide – JusticeSingularity – Jon Hopkins
Treehouse – Sofi Tukker
Oil of Every Pearl's Un-Insides – SOPHIE
Lune Rouge – TOKiMONSTA

Contemporary Instrumental Music
Best Contemporary Instrumental Album
 Steve Gadd Band – Steve Gadd Band The Emancipation Procrastination – Christian Scott aTunde Adjuah
 Modern Lore – Julian Lage
 Laid Black – Marcus Miller
 Protocol IV – Simon Phillips

Rock
Best Rock Performance
 "When Bad Does Good" – Chris Cornell (posthumous)
 "Four Out of Five" – Arctic Monkeys
 "Made an America" – Fever 333
 "Highway Tune" – Greta Van Fleet
 "Uncomfortable" – Halestorm

Best Metal Performance
 "Electric Messiah" – High on Fire "Condemned to the Gallows" – Between the Buried and Me
 "Honeycomb" – Deafheaven
 "Betrayer" – Trivium
 "On My Teeth" – Underoath

Best Rock Song
 "Masseduction"Jack Antonoff & Annie Clark, songwriters (St. Vincent) "Black Smoke Rising"
Jacob Thomas Kiszka, Joshua Michael Kiszka, Samuel Francis Kiszka, & Daniel Robert Wagner, songwriters (Greta Van Fleet)
 "Jumpsuit"
Tyler Joseph, songwriter (Twenty One Pilots)
 "Mantra"
Jordan Fish, Matthew Kean, Lee Malia, Matthew Nicholls, & Oliver Sykes, songwriters (Bring Me the Horizon)
 "Rats"
Tom Dalgety & A Ghoul Writer, songwriters (Ghost)

Best Rock AlbumFrom the Fires – Greta Van FleetRainier Fog – Alice in Chains
Mania – Fall Out Boy
Prequelle – Ghost
Pacific Daydream – Weezer

Alternative
Best Alternative Music AlbumColors – BeckTranquility Base Hotel & Casino – Arctic Monkeys
Utopia – Björk
American Utopia – David Byrne
Masseduction – St. Vincent

R&B
Best R&B Performance
 "Best Part" – H.E.R. featuring Daniel Caesar "Long as I Live" – Toni Braxton
 "Summer" – The Carters
 "Y O Y" – Lalah Hathaway
 "First Began" – PJ Morton

Best Traditional R&B Performance
 "Bet Ain't Worth the Hand" – Leon Bridges "How Deep Is Your Love" – PJ Morton featuring Yebba "Don't Fall Apart on Me Tonight" – Bettye LaVette
 "Honest" – MAJOR.
 "Made for Love" – Charlie Wilson featuring Lalah Hathaway

Best R&B Song
 "Boo'd Up" Larrance Dopson, Joelle James, Ella Mai & Dijon McFarlane, songwriters (Ella Mai) "Come Through and Chill"
 Jermaine Cole, Miguel Pimentel & Salaam Remi, songwriters (Miguel featuring J. Cole & Salaam Remi)
 "Feels Like Summer"
 Donald Glover & Ludwig Göransson, songwriters (Childish Gambino)
 "Focus"
 Darhyl Camper Jr., H.E.R. & Justin Love, songwriters (H.E.R.)
 "Long as I Live"
 Paul Boutin, Toni Braxton & Antonio Dixon, songwriters (Toni Braxton)

Best Urban Contemporary Album
 Everything Is Love – The Carters The Kids Are Alright – Chloe x Halle
 Chris Dave and the Drumhedz – Chris Dave and the Drumhedz
 War & Leisure – Miguel
 Ventriloquism – Meshell Ndegeocello

Best R&B Album
 H.E.R. – H.E.R. Sex & Cigarettes – Toni Braxton
 Good Thing – Leon Bridges
 Honestly – Lalah Hathaway
 Gumbo Unplugged – PJ Morton

Rap
Best Rap Performance
 "King's Dead" – Kendrick Lamar, Jay Rock, Future & James Blake "Bubblin" –  "Be Careful" – Cardi B
 "Nice for What" – Drake
 "Sicko Mode" – Travis Scott, Drake & Swae Lee

Best Rap/Sung Performance
 "This Is America" – Childish Gambino "Like I Do" – Christina Aguilera featuring Goldlink
 "Pretty Little Fears" – 6lack featuring J. Cole
 "All the Stars" – Kendrick Lamar & SZA
 "Rockstar" – Post Malone featuring 21 Savage
     
Best Rap Song
 "God's Plan" Aubrey Graham, Daveon Jackson, Brock Korsan, Ron LaTour, Matthew Samuels & Noah Shebib, songwriters (Drake) "King's Dead"
 Kendrick Duckworth, Samuel Gloade, James Litherland, Johnny McKinzie, Axel Morgan, Mark Spears, Travis Walton, Nayvadius Wilburn & Michael Williams II, songwriters (Kendrick Lamar, Jay Rock, Future & James Blake)
 "Lucky You"
 R. Fraser, G. Lucas, M. Mathers, M. Samuels & J. Sweet, songwriters (Eminem featuring Joyner Lucas)
 "Sicko Mode"
 Khalif Brown, Rogét Chahayed, BryTavious Chambers, Mike Dean, Mirsad Dervic, Kevin Gomringer, Tim Gomringer, Aubrey Graham, Chauncey Hollis, Jacques Webster, Ozan Yildirim & Cydel Young, songwriters (Travis Scott, Drake & Swae Lee)
 "Win"
 K. Duckworth, A. Hernandez, J. McKinzie, M. Samuels & C. Thompson, songwriters (Jay Rock)

Best Rap Album
 Invasion of Privacy – Cardi B Swimming – Mac Miller
 Victory Lap – Nipsey Hussle
 Daytona – Pusha T
 Astroworld – Travis Scott

Country
Best Country Solo Performance
 "Butterflies" – Kacey Musgraves "Wouldn't It Be Great?" – Loretta Lynn
 "Mona Lisas and Mad Hatters" – Maren Morris
 "Millionaire" – Chris Stapleton
 "Parallel Line" – Keith Urban

Best Country Duo/Group Performance
 "Tequila" – Dan + Shay "Shoot Me Straight" – Brothers Osborne
 "When Someone Stops Loving You" – Little Big Town
 "Dear Hate" – Maren Morris featuring Vince Gill
 "Meant to Be" – Bebe Rexha & Florida Georgia Line

Best Country Song
 "Space Cowboy" Luke Laird, Shane McAnally & Kacey Musgraves, songwriters (Kacey Musgraves) "Break Up in the End"
 Jessie Jo Dillon, Chase McGill & Jon Nite, songwriters (Cole Swindell)
 "Dear Hate"
 Tom Douglas, David Hodges & Maren Morris, songwriters (Maren Morris featuring Vince Gill)
 "I Lived It"
 Rhett Akins, Ross Copperman, Ashley Gorley & Ben Hayslip, songwriters (Blake Shelton)
 "Tequila"
 Nicolle Galyon, Jordan Reynolds & Dan Smyers, songwriters (Dan + Shay)
 "When Someone Stops Loving You"
 Hillary Lindsey, Chase McGill & Lori McKenna, songwriters (Little Big Town)

Best Country Album
 Golden Hour – Kacey Musgraves
 Unapologetically – Kelsea Ballerini
 Port Saint Joe – Brothers Osborne
 Girl Going Nowhere – Ashley McBryde
 From a Room: Volume 2 – Chris Stapleton

New Age
Best New Age Album
 Opium Moon – Opium Moon Hiraeth – Lisa Gerrard & David Kuckhermann
 Beloved – Snatam Kaur
 Molecules of Motion – Steve Roach
 Moku Maluhia: Peaceful Island – Jim Kimo West

Jazz
Best Improvised Jazz Solo
 "Don't Fence Me In" – John Daversa, soloist "Some of That Sunshine" – Regina Carter, soloist
 "We See" – Fred Hersch, soloists
 "De-Dah" – Brad Mehldau, soloist
 "Cadenas" – Miguel Zenón, soloist

Best Jazz Vocal Album
 The Window – Cécile McLorin Salvant My Mood Is You – Freddy Cole
 The Questions – Kurt Elling
 The Subject Tonight Is Love – Kate McGarry with Keith Ganz & Gary Versace
 If You Really Want – Raul Midón with Metropole Orkest conducted by Vince Mendoza

Best Jazz Instrumental Album
 Emanon – The Wayne Shorter Quartet Diamond Cut – Tia Fuller
 Live in Europe – Fred Hersch Trio
 Seymour Reads the Constitution! – Brad Mehldau Trio
 Still Dreaming – Joshua Redman, Ron Miles, Scott Colley & Brian Blade

Best Large Jazz Ensemble Album
 American Dreamers: Voices of Hope, Music of Freedom – John Daversa Big Band featuring DACA Artists All About That Basie – Count Basie Orchestra directed by Scotty Barnhart
 Presence – Orrin Evans and the Captain Black Big Band
 All Can Work – John Hollenbeck Large Ensemble
 Barefoot Dances and Other Visions – Jim McNeely & The Frankfurt Radio Big Band

Best Latin Jazz Album
 Back to the Sunset – Dafnis Prieto Big Band Heart of Brazil – Eddie Daniels
 West Side Story Reimagined – Bobby Sanabria Multiverse Big Band
 Cinque – Elio Villafranca
 Yo Soy La Tradición – Miguel Zenón featuring Spektral Quartet

Gospel/Contemporary Christian Music
Best Gospel Performance/Song
 "Never Alone" – Tori Kelly featuring Kirk Franklin Kirk Franklin & Victoria Kelly, songwriters "You Will Win" – Jekalyn Carr
 Allen Carr & Jekalyn Carr, songwriters
 "Won't He Do It" – Koryn Hawthorne
 Koryn Hawthorne
 "Cycles" – Jonathan McReynolds featuring DOE
 Jonathan McReynolds & Will Reagan, songwriters
 "A Great Work" – Brian Courtney Wilson
 Aaron W. Lindsey, Alvin Richardson & Brian Courtney Wilson, songwriters

Best Contemporary Christian Music Performance/Song
 "You Say" – Lauren Daigle Lauren Daigle, Jason Ingram & Paul Mabury, songwriters "Reckless Love" – Cory Asbury
 Cory Asbury, Caleb Culver & Ran Jackson, songwriters
 "Joy." – For King & Country
 Ben Glover, Matt Hales, Stephen Blake Kanicka, Seth Mosley, Joel Smallbone, Luke Smallbone & Tedd Tjornhom, songwriters
 "Grace Got You" – MercyMe featuring John Reuben
 David Garcia, Ben Glover, MercyMe, Solomon Olds & John Reuben, songwriters
 "Known" – Tauren Wells
 Ethan Hulse, Jordan Sapp & Tauren Wells, songwriters

Best Gospel Album
 Hiding Place – Tori Kelly One Nation Under God – Jekalyn Carr
 Make Room – Jonathan McReynolds
 The Other Side – The Walls Group
 A Great Work – Brian Courtney Wilson

Best Contemporary Christian Music Album
 Look Up Child – Lauren Daigle Hallelujah Here Below – Elevation Worship
 Living With a Fire – Jesus Culture
 Surrounded – Michael W. Smith
 Survivor: Live from Harding Prison – Zach Williams

Best Roots Gospel Album
 Unexpected – Jason Crabb Clear Skies – Ernie Haase & Signature Sound
 Favorites: Revisited by Request – The Isaacs
 Still Standing – The Martins
 Love Love Love – Gordon Mote

Latin
Best Latin Pop Album
 Sincera – Claudia Brant Prometo – Pablo Alborán
 Musas (Un Homenaje al Folclore Latinoamericano en Manos de Los Macorinos), Vol 2 – Natalia Lafourcade
 2:00 AM – Raquel Sofía
 Vives – Carlos Vives

Best Latin Rock, Urban or Alternative Album
 Aztlán – Zoé Claroscura – Aterciopelados
 COASTCITY – COASTCITY
 Encanto Tropical – Monsieur Periné
 Gourmet – Orishas

Best Regional Mexican Music Album (Including Tejano)
 ¡México Por Siempre! – Luis Miguel Primero Soy Mexicana – Ángela Aguilar
 Mitad y Mitad – Calibre 50
 Totalmente Juan Gabriel Vol. II – Aida Cuevas
 Cruzando Borders – Los Texmaniacs
 Leyendas de Mi Pueblo – Mariachi Sol de Mexico de José Hernández

Best Tropical Latin Album
 Anniversary – Spanish Harlem Orchestra Pa' Mi Gente – Charlie Aponte
 Legado – Formell y Los Van Van
 Orquesta Akokán – Orquesta Akokán
 Ponle Actitud – Felipe Peláez

American Roots Music
Best American Roots Performance
 "The Joke" – Brandi Carlile "Kick Rocks" – Sean Ardoin
 "St. James Infirmary Blues" – Jon Batiste
 "All on My Mind" – Anderson East
 "Last Man Standing" – Willie Nelson

Best American Roots Song
 "The Joke" Brandi Carlile, Dave Cobb, Phil Hanseroth & Tim Hanseroth, songwriters (Brandi Carlile) "All the Trouble"
 Waylon Payne, Lee Ann Womack & Adam Wright, songwriters (Lee Ann Womack)
 "Build a Bridge"
 Jeff Tweedy, songwriter (Mavis Staples)
 "Knockin' on Your Screen Door"
 Pat McLaughlin & John Prine, songwriters (John Prine)
 "Summer's End"
 Pat McLaughlin & John Prine, songwriters (John Prine)

Best Americana Album
 By the Way, I Forgive You – Brandi Carlile Things Have Changed – Bettye LaVette
 The Tree of Forgiveness – John Prine
 The Lonely, the Lonesome & the Gone – Lee Ann Womack
 One Drop of Truth – The Wood Brothers

Best Bluegrass Album
 The Travelin' McCourys – The Travelin' McCourys Portraits in Fiddles – Mike Barnett
 Sister Sadie II – Sister Sadie
 Rivers and Roads – The Special Consensus
 North of Despair – Wood & Wire

Best Traditional Blues Album
 The Blues Is Alive and Well – Buddy Guy Something Smells Funky 'Round Here – Elvin Bishop's Big Fun Trio
 Benton County Relic – Cedric Burnside
 No Mercy in This Land – Ben Harper and Charlie Musselwhite
 Don't You Feel My Leg (The Naughty Bawdy Blues of Blue Lu Barker) – Maria Muldaur

Best Contemporary Blues Album
 Please Don't Be Dead – Fantastic Negrito Here in Babylon – Teresa James & the Rhythm Tramps
 Cry No More – Danielle Nicole
 Out of the Blues – Boz Scaggs
 Victor Wainwright and the Train – Victor Wainwright and the Train

Best Folk Album
 All Ashore – Punch Brothers Whistle Down the Wind – Joan Baez
 Black Cowboys – Dom Flemons
 Rifles & Rosary Beads – Mary Gauthier
 Weed Garden – Iron & Wine

Best Regional Roots Music Album
 No 'Ane'i – Kalani Pe'a Kreole Rock and Soul – Sean Ardoin
 Spyboy – Cha Wa
 Aloha from Na Hoa – Na Hoa
 Mewasinsational: Cree Round Dance Songs – Young Spirit

Reggae
Best Reggae Album
 44/876 – Sting & Shaggy As the World Turns – Black Uhuru
 Reggae Forever – Etana
 Rebellion Rises – Ziggy Marley
 A Matter of Time – Protoje

World Music
Best World Music Album
 Freedom – Soweto Gospel Choir Deran – Bombino
 Fenfo – Fatoumata Diawara
 Black Times – Seun Kuti & Egypt 80
 The Lost Songs of World War II – Yiddish Glory

Children's
Best Children's Album
 All the Sounds – Lucy Kalantari & The Jazz Cats Building Blocks – Tim Kubart
 Falu's Bazaar – Falu
 Giants of Science – The Pop Ups
 The Nation of Imagine – FRANK & DEANE

Spoken Word
Best Spoken Word Album (Includes Poetry, Audio Books & Storytelling)
 Faith: A Journey for All – Jimmy Carter Accessory to War – Courtney B. Vance
 Calypso – David Sedaris
 Creative Quest – Questlove
 The Last Black Unicorn – Tiffany Haddish

Comedy
Best Comedy Album
 Equanimity & The Bird Revelation – Dave Chappelle Annihilation – Patton Oswalt
 Noble Ape – Jim Gaffigan
 Standup for Drummers – Fred Armisen
 Tamborine – Chris Rock

Musical Theater
Best Musical Theater Album
 The Band's Visit – Etai Benson, Adam Kantor, Katrina Lenk & Ari'el Stachel, principal soloists; Dean Sharenow & David Yazbek, producers; David Yazbek, composer & lyricist (Original Broadway Cast) Carousel – Renée Fleming, Alexander Gemignani, Joshua Henry, Lindsay Mendez & Jessie Mueller, principal soloists; Steven Epstein, producer (Richard Rodgers, composer; Oscar Hammerstein II, lyricist) (2018 Broadway Cast)
 Jesus Christ Superstar Live in Concert – Sara Bareilles, Alice Cooper, Ben Daniels, Brandon Victor Dixon, Erik Grönwall, Jin Ha, John Legend, Norm Lewis & Jason Tam, principal soloists; Andrew Lloyd Webber & Harvey Mason Jr., producers (Andrew Lloyd Webber, composer; Tim Rice, lyricist) (Original Television Cast)
 My Fair Lady – Lauren Ambrose, Norbert Leo Butz & Harry Hadden-Paton, principal soloists; Van Dean, David Lai, & Ted Sperling, producers (Frederick Loewe, composer; Alan Jay Lerner, lyricist) (2018 Broadway Cast)
 Once on This Island – Phillip Boykin, Merle Dandridge, Quentin Earl Darrington, Hailey Kilgore, Kenita R. Miller, Alex Newell, Isaac Powell & Lea Salonga, principal soloists; Lynn Ahrens, Stephen Flaherty & Elliot Scheiner, producers (Stephen Flaherty, composer; Lynn Ahrens, lyricist) (New Broadway Cast)

Music for Visual Media
Best Compilation Soundtrack for Visual Media
 The Greatest Showman – Hugh Jackman (& various artists) Alex Lacamoire, Benj Pasek, Justin Paul & Greg Wells, compilation producers Call Me by Your Name – (Various artists)
 Luca Guadagnino, compilation producer; Robin Urdang, music supervisor
 Deadpool 2 – (Various artists)
 David Leitch & Ryan Reynolds, compilation producers; John Houlihan, music supervisor
 Lady Bird – (Various artists)
 Timothy J. Smith, compilation producer; Michael Hill & Brian Ross, music supervisors
 Stranger Things – (Various artists)
 Matt Duffer, Ross Duffer, Timothy J. Smith, compilation producer; Nora Felder, music supervisor

Best Score Soundtrack for Visual Media
 Black Panther – Ludwig Göransson, composer Blade Runner 2049 – Benjamin Wallfisch & Hans Zimmer, composers
 Coco – Michael Giacchino, composer
 The Shape of Water – Alexandre Desplat, composer
 Star Wars: The Last Jedi – John Williams, composer

Best Song Written for Visual Media
 "Shallow" (from A Star Is Born) Lady Gaga, Mark Ronson, Anthony Rossomando & Andrew Wyatt, songwriters (Lady Gaga & Bradley Cooper) "All the Stars" (from Black Panther)
 Kendrick Duckworth, Solána Rowe, Alexander William Shuckburgh, Mark Anthony Spears & Anthony Tiffith, songwriters (Kendrick Lamar & SZA)
 "Mystery of Love" (from Call Me by Your Name)
 Sufjan Stevens, songwriter (Sufjan Stevens)
 "Remember Me" (from Coco)
 Kristen Anderson-Lopez & Robert Lopez, songwriters (Miguel featuring Natalia Lafourcade)
 "This Is Me" (from The Greatest Showman)
 Benj Pasek & Justin Paul, songwriters (Keala Settle & The Greatest Showman Ensemble)

Composing
Best Instrumental Composition
 "Blut und Boden (Blood and Soil)" Terence Blanchard, composer (Terence Blanchard) "Chrysalis"
 Jeremy Kittel, composer (Kittel & Co.)
 "Infinity War"
 Alan Silvestri, composer (Alan Silvestri)
 "Mine Mission"
 John Powell & John Williams, composers (John Powell & John Williams)
 "The Shape of Water"
 Alexandre Desplat, composer (Alexandre Desplat)

Arranging
Best Arrangement, Instrumental or A Cappella
 "Stars and Stripes Forever" John Daversa, arranger (John Daversa Big Band featuring DACA Artists) "Batman Theme (TV)"
 Randy Waldman & Justin Wilson, arrangers (Randy Waldman featuring Wynton Marsalis)
 "Change the World"
 Mark Kibble, arranger (Take 6)
 "Madrid Finale"
 John Powell, arranger (John Powell)
 "The Shape of Water"
 Alexandre Desplat, arranger (Alexandre Desplat)

Best Arrangement, Instruments and Vocals
 "Spiderman Theme" Mark Kibble, Randy Waldman & Justin Wilson, arrangers (Randy Waldman featuring Take 6 & Chris Potter) "It Was a Very Good Year"
 Matt Rollings & Kristin Wilkinson, arrangers (Willie Nelson)
 "Jolene"
 Dan Pugach & Nicole Zuraitis, arrangers (Dan Pugach)
 "Mona Lisa"
 Vince Mendoza, arranger (Gregory Porter)
 "Niña"
 Gonzalo Grau, arranger (Magos Herrera & Brooklyn Rider)

Packaging
Best Recording Package
 Masseduction
 Willo Perron, art director (St. Vincent)
 Be the Cowboy
 Mary Banas, art director (Mitski)
Love Yourself: Tear
 Doohee Lee, art director (BTS)
 The Offering
 Qing-Yang Xiao, art director (The Chairman)
 Well Kept Thing
 Adam Moore, art director (Foxhole)

Best Boxed or Special Limited Edition Package
 Squeeze Box: The Complete Works of "Weird Al" Yankovic
 Meghan Foley, Annie Stoll & Al Yankovic, art directors ("Weird Al" Yankovic)
 Appetite for Destruction (Locked n' Loaded Box)
 Arian Buhler, Charles Dooher, Jeff Fura, Scott Sandler & Matt Taylor, art directors (Guns N' Roses)
 I'll Be Your Girl
 Carson Ellis, Jeri Heiden & Glen Nakasako, art directors (The Decemberists)
 Pacific Northwest '73–'74: The Complete Recordings
 Lisa Glines, Doran Tyson & Roy Henry Vickers, art directors (Grateful Dead)
 Too Many Bad Habits
 Sarah Dodds & Shauna Dodds, art directors (Johnny Nicholas)

Notes
Best Album Notes
 Voices of Mississippi: Artists and Musicians Documented by William Ferris
 David Evans, album notes writer (Various artists)
 Alpine Dreaming: The Helvetia Records Story, 1920-1924
 James P. Leary, album notes writer (Various artists)
 4 Banjo Songs, 1891-1897: Foundational Recordings of America's Iconic Instrument
 Richard Martin & Ted Olson, album notes writer (Charles A. Asbury)
 The 1960 Time Sessions
 Ben Ratliff, album notes writer (Sonny Clark Trio)
 The Product of Our Souls: The Sound and Sway of James Reese Europe's Society Orchestra
 David Gilbert, album notes writer (Various artists)
 Trouble No More: The Bootleg Series Vol. 13/1979-1981 (Deluxe Edition)
 Amanda Petrusich, album notes writer (Bob Dylan)

Historical
Best Historical Album
 Voices of Mississippi: Artists and Musicians Documented by William Ferris
 William Ferris, April Ledbetter & Steven Lance Ledbetter, compilation producers; Michael Graves, mastering engineer (Various artists)
 Any Other Way
 Rob Bowman, Douglas McGowan, Rob Sevier & Ken Shipley, compilation producers; Jeff Lipton & Maria Rice, mastering engineer (Jackie Shane)
 At the Louisiana Hayride Tonight...
 Martin Hawkins, compilation producer; Christian Zwarg, mastering engineer (Various artists)
 Battleground Korea: Songs and Sounds of America's Forgotten War
 Hugo Keesing, compilation producer; Christian Zwarg, mastering engineer (Various artists)
 A Rhapsody in Blue: The Extraordinary Life of Oscar Levant
 Robert Russ, compilation producer; Andreas K. Meyer & Rebekah Wineman, mastering engineers (Oscar Levant)

Production, Non-Classical

Best Engineered Album, Non-Classical
 Colors
 Julian Burg, Şerban Ghenea, David "Elevator" Greenbaum, John Hanes, Beck Hansen, Greg Kurstin, Florian Lagatta, Cole M.G.N., Alex Pasco, Jesse Shatkin, Darrell Thorp & Cassidy Turbin, engineers; Chris Bellman, Tom Coyne, Emily Lazar & Randy Merrill, mastering engineers (Beck)
 All the Things That I Did and All the Things That I Didn't Do
 Ryan Freeland & Kenneth Pattengale, engineers; Kim Rosen, mastering engineer (The Milk Carton Kids)
 Earthtones
 Robbie Lackritz, engineer; Philip Shaw Bova, mastering engineer (Bahamas)
 Head Over Heels
 Nathaniel Alford, Jason Evigan, Chris Galland, Tom Gardner, Patrick "P-Thugg" Gemayel, Şerban Ghenea, John Hanes, Tony Hoffer, Derek Keota, Ian Kirkpatrick, David Macklovitch, Amber Mark, Manny Marroquin, Vaughn Oliver, Chris "TEK" O'Ryan, Morgan Taylor Reid & Gian Stone, engineers; Chris Gehringer & Michelle Mancini, mastering engineers (Chromeo)
 Voicenotes
 Manny Marroquin & Charlie Puth, engineers; Dave Kutch, mastering engineer (Charlie Puth)

Producer of the Year, Non-Classical
 Pharrell Williams
 "Apeshit" (The Carters)
 Man of the Woods (Justin Timberlake)
 No One Ever Really Dies (N.E.R.D)
 "Stir Fry" (Migos)
 Sweetener (Ariana Grande)
 Boi-1da
 "Be Careful" (Cardi B)
 "Diplomatic Immunity" (Drake)
 "Friends" (The Carters)
 "God's Plan" (Drake)
 "Heard About Us" (The Carters)
 "Lucky You" (Eminem featuring Joyner Lucas)
 "Mob Ties" (Drake)
 "No Limit" (G-Eazy featuring ASAP Rocky & Cardi B)
 Larry Klein
 "All These Things" (Thomas Dybdahl)
 Anthem (Madeleine Peyroux)
 The Book of Longing (Luciana Souza)
 "Can I Have It All" (Thomas Dybdahl)
 Junk (Hailey Tuck)
 "Look at What We've Done" (Thomas Dybdahl)
 Meaning to Tell Ya (Molly Johnson)
 Linda Perry
 "Harder, Better, Faster, Stronger" (Willa Amai)
 Served Like a Girl (Various artists)
 28 Days in the Valley (Dorothy)
 Kanye West
Daytona (Pusha T)
 Kids See Ghosts (Kids See Ghosts)
 K.T.S.E. (Teyana Taylor)
 Nasir (Nas)
 Ye (Kanye West)

Best Remixed Recording
 "Walking Away" (Mura Masa Remix)
 Alex Crossan, remixer (Haim)
 "Audio" (CID Remix)
 CID, remixer (LSD)
 "How Long" (EDX's Dubai Skyline Remix)
 Maurizio Colella & Christian Hirt, remixers (Charlie Puth)
 "Only Road" (Cosmic Gate Remix)
 Stefan Bossems & Claus Terhoeven, remixers (Gabriel & Dresden featuring Sub Teal)
 "Stargazing" (Kaskade Remix)
 Kaskade, remixer (Kygo featuring Justin Jesso)

Production, Immersive Audio
Best Immersive Audio Album
 Eye in the Sky: 35th Anniversary Edition
 Alan Parsons, surround mix engineer; Dave Donnelly, PJ Olsson & Alan Parsons, surround mastering engineers; Alan Parsons, surround producer (The Alan Parsons Project)
 Folketoner
 Morten Lindberg, surround mix engineer; Morten Lindberg, surround mastering engineer; Morten Lindberg, surround producer (Anne Karin Sundal-Ask & Det Norske Jentekor)
 Seven Words from the Cross
 Daniel Shores, surround mix engineer; Daniel Shores, surround mastering engineer; Dan Merceruio, surround producer (Matthew Guard & Skylark)
 Sommerro: Ujamaa & the Iceberg
 Morten Lindberg, surround mix engineer; Morten Lindberg, surround mastering engineer; Morten Lindberg, surround producer (Ingar Heine Bergby, Trondheim Symphony Orchestra & Choir)
 Symbol
 Prashant Mistry & Ronald Prent, surround mix engineers; Darcy Proper, surround mastering engineer; Prashant Mistry & Ronald Prent, surround producers (Engine-Earz Experiment)

Production, Classical
Best Engineered Album, Classical
 Shostakovich: Symphonies Nos. 4 & 11
 Shawn Murphy & Nick Squire, engineers; Tim Martyn, mastering engineer (Andris Nelsons & Boston Symphony Orchestra)
 Bates: The (R)evolution of Steve Jobs
 Mark Donahue & Dirk Sobotka, engineers; Mark Donahue, mastering engineer (Michael Christie, Garrett Sorenson, Wei Wu, Sasha Cooke, Edwards Parks, Jessica E. Jones & Santa Fe Opera Orchestra)
 Beethoven: Symphony No. 3; Strauss: Horn Concerto No. 1
 Mark Donahue, engineer; Mark Donahue, mastering engineer (Manfred Honeck & Pittsburgh Symphony Orchestra)
 John Williams at the Movies
 Keith O. Johnson & Sean Royce Martin, engineers; Keith O. Johnson, mastering engineer (Jerry Junkin & Dallas Winds)
 Liquid Melancholy: Clarinet Music of James M. Stephenson
 Bill Maylone & Mary Mazurek, engineers; Bill Maylone, mastering engineer (John Bruce Yeh)
 Visions and Variations
 Tom Caulfield, engineer; Jesse Lewis, mastering engineer (A Far Cry)

Producer of the Year, Classical
 Blanton Alspaugh
 Arnesen: Infinity – Choral Works (Joel Rinsema & Kantorei)
 Aspects of America (Carlos Kalmar & Oregon Symphony)
 Chesnokov: Teach Me Thy Statutes (Vladimir Gorbik & PaTRAM Institute Male Choir)
 Gordon, R.: The House Without a Christmas Tree (Bradley Moore, Elisabeth Leone, Maximillian Macias, Megan Mikailovna Samarin, Patricia Schuman, Lauren Snouffer, Heidi Stober, Daniel Belcher, Houston Grand Opera Juvenile Chorus & Houston Grand Opera Orchestra)
 Haydn: The Creation (Andrés Orozco-Estrada, Betsy Cook Weber, Houston Symphony & Houston Symphony Chorus)
 Heggie: Great Scott (Patrick Summers, Manuel Palazzo, Mark Hancock, Michael Mayes, Rodell Rosel, Kevin Burdette, Anthony Roth Costanzo, Nathan Gunn, Frederica von Stade, Ailyn Pérez, Joyce DiDonato, Dallas Opera Chorus & Orchestra)
 Music of Fauré, Buide & Zemlinsky (Trio Séléné)
 Paterson: Three Way – A Trio of One-Act Operas (Dean Williamson, Daniele Pastin, Courtney Ruckman, Eliza Bonet, Melisa Bonetti, Jordan Rutter, Samuel Levine, Wes Mason, Matthew Treviño & Nashville Opera Orchestra)
 Vaughan Williams: Piano Concerto; Oboe Concerto; Serenade to Music; Flos Campi (Peter Oundjian & Toronto Symphony Orchestra)
 David Frost
 Beethoven: Piano Sonatas, Volume 7 (Jonathan Biss)
 Mirror in Mirror (Anne Akiko Meyers, Kristjan Järvi & Philharmonia Orchestra)
 Mozart: Idomeneo (James Levine, Alan Opie, Matthew Polenzani, Alice Coote, Nadine Sierra, Elza van den Heever, The Metropolitan Opera Orchestra & Chorus)
 Presentiment (Orion Weiss)
 Strauss, R.: Der Rosenkavalier (Sebastian Weigle, Renée Fleming, Elīna Garanča, Erin Morley, Günther Groissböck, Metropolitan Opera Orchestra & Chorus)
 Elizabeth Ostrow
 Bates: The (R)evolution of Steve Jobs (Michael Christie, Garrett Sorenson, Wei Wu, Sasha Cooke, Edwards Parks, Jessica E. Jones & Santa Fe Opera Orchestra)
 The Road Home (Joshua Habermann & Santa Fe Desert Chorale)
 Judith Sherman
 Beethoven Unbound (Llŷr Williams)
 Black Manhattan Volume 3 (Rick Benjamin & Paragon Ragtime Orchestra)
 Bolcom: Piano Music (Various artists)
 Del Tredici: March to Tonality (Mark Peskanov & various artists)
 Love Comes in at the Eye (Timothy Jones, Stephanie Sant'Ambrogio, Jeffrey Sykes, Anthony Ross, Carol Cook, Beth Rapier & Stephanie Jutt)
 Meltzer: Variations on a Summer Day & Piano Quartet (Abigail Fischer, Jayce Ogren & Sequitur)
 Mendelssohn: Complete Works for Cello and Piano (Marcy Rosen & Lydia Artymiw)
 New Music for Violin and Piano (Julie Rosenfeld & Peter Miyamoto)
 Reich: Pulse/Quartet (Colin Currie Group & International Contemporary Ensemble)
 Dirk Sobotka
 Beethoven: Symphony No. 3; Strauss: Horn Concerto No. 1 (Manfred Honeck & Pittsburgh Symphony Orchestra)
 Lippencott: Frontier Symphony (Jeff Lippencott & Ligonier Festival Orchestra)
 Mahler: Symphony No. 8 (Thierry Fischer, Mormon Tabernacle Choir & Utah Symphony)
 Music of the Americas (Andrés Orozco-Estrada & Houston Symphony)

Classical
Best Orchestral Performance
 Shostakovich: Symphonies Nos. 4 & 11
Andris Nelsons, conductor (Boston Symphony Orchestra)
 Beethoven: Symphony No. 3; Strauss: Horn Concerto No. 1
Manfred Honeck, conductor (Pittsburgh Symphony Orchestra)
 Nielsen: Symphony No. 3 & Symphony No. 4
Thomas Dausgaard, conductor (Seattle Symphony)
 Ruggles, Stucky & Harbison: Orchestral Works
David Alan Miller, conductor (National Orchestral Institute Philharmonic)
 Schumann: Symphonies Nos. 1-4
Michael Tilson Thomas, conductor (San Francisco Symphony)

Best Opera Recording
 Bates: The (R)evolution of Steve Jobs
Michael Christie, conductor; Sasha Cooke, Jessica E. Jones, Edward Parks, Garrett Sorenson & Wei Wu; Elizabeth Ostrow, producer (The Santa Fe Opera Orchestra)
 Adams: Doctor Atomic
John Adams, conductor; Aubrey Allicock, Julia Bullock, Gerald Finley & Brindley Sherratt; Friedemann Engelbrecht, producer (The BBC Symphony Orchestra; BBC Singers)
 Lully: Alceste
Christophe Rousset, conductor; Edwin Crossley-Mercer, Emiliano Gonzalez Toro & Judith van Wanroij; Maximilien Ciup, producer (Les Talens Lyriques; Chœur de chambre de Namur)
 Strauss, R.: Der Rosenkavalier
Sebastian Weigle, conductor; Renée Fleming, Elīna Garanča, Günther Groissböck & Erin Morley; David Frost, producer (Metropolitan Opera Orchestra; The Metropolitan Opera Chorus)
 Verdi: Rigoletto
Constantine Orbelian, conductor; Francesco Demuro, Dmitri Hvorostovsky & Nadine Sierra; Vilius Keras & Aleksandra Keriene, producers (Kaunas City Symphony Orchestra; Men of the Kaunas State Choir)

Best Choral Performance
 McLoskey: Zealot Canticles
 Donald Nally, conductor (Doris Hall-Gulati, Rebecca Harris, Arlen Hlusko, Lorenzo Raval & Mandy Wolman; The Crossing)
 Chesnokov: Teach Me Thy Statutes
 Vladimir Gorbik, conductor (Mikhail Davydov & Vladimir Krasov; PaTRAM Institute Male Choir)
 Kastalsky: Memory Eternal
 Steven Fox, conductor (The Clarion Choir)
 Rachmaninov: The Bells
 Mariss Jansons, conductor; Peter Dijkstra, chorus master (Oleg Dolgov, Alexey Markov & Tatiana Pavlovskaya; Symphonieorchester des Bayerischen Rundfunks; Chor des Bayerischen Rundfunks)
 Seven Words from the Cross
 Matthew Guard, conductor (Skylark)

Best Chamber Music/Small Ensemble Performance
 Anderson, Laurie: Landfall – Laurie Anderson & Kronos Quartet Beethoven, Shostakovich & Bach – The Danish String Quartet
 Blueprinting – Aizuri Quartet
 Stravinsky: The Rite of Spring Concerto for Two Pianos – Leif Ove Andsnes & Marc-André Hamelin
 Visions and Variations – A Far Cry

Best Classical Instrumental Solo
 Kernis: Violin Concerto – James Ehnes Ludovic Morlot, conductor (Seattle Symphony) Bartók: Piano Concerto No. 2 – Yuja Wang
 Simon Rattle, conductor (Berliner Philharmoniker)
 Biber: The Mystery Sonatas – Christina Day Martinson
 Martin Pearlman, conductor (Boston Baroque)
 Bruch: Scottish Fantasy, Op. 46; Violin Concerto No. 1 in G Minor, Op. 26
 Joshua Bell (The Academy of St. Martin in the Fields)
 Glass: Three Pieces in the Shape of a Square
 Craig Morris

Best Classical Solo Vocal Album
 Songs of Orpheus: Monteverdi, Caccini, d'India & Landi – Karim Sulayman Jeannette Sorrell, conductor; Apollo's Fire, ensembles ARC – Anthony Roth Costanzo
 Jonathan Cohen, conductor (Les Violons du Roy)
 The Handel Album – Philippe Jaroussky
 Artaserse, ensemble
 Mirages – Sabine Devieilhe
 François-Xavier Roth, conductor (Alexandre Tharaud; Marianne Crebassa & Jodie Devos; Les Siècles)
 Schubert: Winterreise – Randall Scarlata
 Gilbert Kalish, accompanist

Best Classical Compendium
 Fuchs: Piano Concerto 'Spiritualist'; Poems of Life; Glacier; Rush
 JoAnn Falletta, conductor; Tim Handley, producer
 Gold
 The King's Singers; Nigel Short, producer
 The John Adams Edition
 Simon Rattle, conductor; Christoph Franke, producer
 John Williams at the Movies
 Jerry Junkin, conductor; Donald J. McKinney, producer
 Vaughan Williams: Piano Concerto; Oboe Concerto; Serenade to Music; Flos Campi
 Peter Oundjian, conductor; Blanton Alspaugh, producer

Best Contemporary Classical Composition
 Kernis: Violin Concerto
 Aaron Jay Kernis, composer (James Ehnes, Ludovic Morlot & Seattle Symphony)
 Bates: The (R)evolution of Steve Jobs
 Mason Bates, composer; Mark Campbell, librettist (Michael Christie, Garrett Sorenson, Wei Wu, Sasha Cooke, Edward Parks, Jessica E. Jones & Santa Fe Opera Orchestra)
 Du Yun: Air Glow
 Du Yun, composer (International Contemporary Ensemble)
 Heggie: Great Scott
 Jake Heggie, composer; Terrence McNally, librettist (Patrick Summers, Manuel Palazzo, Mark Hancock, Michael Mayes, Rodell Rosel, Kevin Burdette, Anthony Roth Costanzo, Nathan Gunn, Frederica von Stade, Ailyn Pérez, Joyce DiDonato, Dallas Opera Chorus & Orchestra)
 Mazzoli: Vespers for Violin
 Missy Mazzoli, composer (Olivia De Prato)

Music Video/Film
Best Music Video
 "This Is America" – Childish Gambino
 Hiro Murai, video directors; Ibra Ake, Jason Cole & Fam Rothstein, video producers
 "Apeshit" – The Carters
 Ricky Saiz, video director; Mélodie Buchris, Natan Schottenfels & Erinn Williams, video producers
 "I'm Not Racist" – Joyner Lucas
 Joyner Lucas & Ben Proulx, video directors; Joyner Lucas, video producer
 "Pynk" – Janelle Monáe
 Emma Westenburg, video director; Justin Benoliel & Whitney Jackson, video producers
 "Mumbo Jumbo" – Tierra Whack
 Marco Prestini, video director; Sara Nassim, video producer

Best Music Film
 Quincy – Quincy Jones
 Alan Hicks & Rashida Jones, video directors; Paula DuPré Pesmen, video producer
 Life in 12 Bars – Eric Clapton
 Lili Fini Zanuck, video director; John Battsek, Scooter Weintraub, Larry Yelen & Lili Fini Zanuck, video producers
 Whitney – (Whitney Houston)
 Kevin Macdonald, video director; Jonathan Chinn, Simon Chinn & Lisa Erspamer, video producers
 Itzhak – Itzhak Perlman
 Alison Chernick, video director; Alison Chernick, video producer
 The King – (Elvis Presley)
 Eugene Jarecki, video director; Christopher Frierson, Georgina Hill, David Kuhn & Christopher St. John, video producers

Special Merit Awards

MusiCares Person of the Year
 Dolly Parton

Lifetime Achievement Award
 Black Sabbath
 George Clinton & Parliament-Funkadelic
 Billy Eckstine
 Donny Hathaway
 Julio Iglesias
 Sam & Dave
 Dionne Warwick

Trustees Award
 Lou Adler
 Ashford & Simpson
 Johnny Mandel

Technical Grammy Award
 Saul Walker

Music Educator Award
 Jeffery Redding (of West Orange High School in Winter Garden, Florida)

Grammy Hall of Fame inductions

In Memoriam

James Ingram
Roy Clark
Harold Bradley
Freddie Hart
Kenny O'Dell
Bonnie Guitar
Nancy Wilson
Charles Aznavour
Morgana King
Vic Damone
Carol Channing
Dennis Edwards
Barbara Alston
Joe Jackson
James "Big Jim" Wright
Ray Sawyer
Jim Rodford
Gary Burden
Avicii
Alan R. Pearlman
Marty Balin
Ed King
John Perry Barlow
Tony Joe White
Otis Rush
Jim Malloy
Mac Miller
Roy Hargrove
Cecil Taylor
Bill Watrous
Geoff Emerick
David Bianco
Russ Solomon
Montserrat Caballé
Katherine Hoover
James Mallinson
Clarence Fountain
Yvonne Staples
Daryle Singletary
Lari White
Sanger D. Shafer
Randy Scruggs
María Dolores Pradera
Lucho Gatica
Wah Wah Watson
D.J. Fontana
Roger Clark
Reggie Young
Daryl Dragon
Dave Rowland
Galt MacDermot
Michel Legrand
Patrick Williams
Arthur B. Rubinstein
Dan Cleary
Jeremy Geffen
Billy Sammeth
Angelica Cob-Baehler
Norman Gimbel
Don Grierson
Russ Regan
Roy Wunsch
Howell Begle
Charles Neville
Henry Butler
Aretha Franklin

Multiple nominations and awards
The following received multiple nominations:

Eight:
Kendrick Lamar
Seven:
Drake
Six:
Boi-1da
Brandi Carlile

Five:
Cardi B
Mike Bozzi
Lady Gaga
Childish Gambino
H.E.R.
Maren Morris
Sounwave
Four:
Dave Cobb
Ludwig Göransson
Greta Van Fleet
40
Post Malone
Manny Marroquin
PJ Morton
Kacey Musgraves
SZA

Three:
Beck
Toni Braxton
Cardo
The Carters (Beyoncé & Jay-Z)
John Daversa
Alexandre Desplat
Grey
Phil Hanseroth
Tim Hanseroth
Lalah Hathaway
Dave Kutch
John Prine
Jay Rock
Mark Ronson
Travis Scott
Al Shux
Chris Stapleton
Zedd

Two:

Christina Aguilera
Blanton Alspaugh
Arctic Monkeys
Sean Ardoin
Chris Athens
Louis Bell
Tony Bennett
Big Hawk
Brian Blade
James Blake
Leslie Brathwaite
Leon Bridges
Brothers Osborne
Camila Cabello
Noel Cadastre
Noel "Gadget" Campbell
Darhyl "Hey DJ" Camper
Jekalyn Carr
Chloe x Halle
J. Cole
Bradley Cooper
Lauren Daigle
DJ Mustard
Mark Donahue
Larrance Dopson
Tom Elmhirst
Tobias Forge
David Frost
Future
Şerban Ghenea
Ben Glover
Ariana Grande
John Hanes
Fred Hersch
Daveon Jackson
Joelle James
Shooter Jennings
Jordan K. Johnson
Stefan Johnson
Tori Kelly
Brock Korsan
Diana Krall
Evan LaRay
Bettye LaVette
Swae Lee
Colin Leonard
Morten Lindberg
Dua Lipa
Marcus Lomax
Joyner Lucas
Pete Lyman
Ella Mai
Chase McGill
Pat McLaughlin
Jonathan McReynolds
Brad Mehldau
Shawn Mendes
Vince Mendoza
Randy Merrill
Miguel
Janelle Monáe
Willie Nelson
Elizabeth Ostrow
Benj Pasek
Justin Paul
John Powell
Simon Rattle
Bebe Rexha
Anthony Rossomando
St. Vincent
Matt Schaeffer
Dan Smyers
Dirk Sobotka
Eddie Spear
Anthony Tiffith
21 Savage
Randy Waldman
John Williams
Brian Courtney Wilson
Lee Ann Womack
Andrew Wyatt
Miguel Zenón
Chris Zwarg 

The following received multiple awards:

Four:
Childish Gambino
Kacey Musgraves

Three:
Brandi Carlile
John Daversa
Lady Gaga
Ludwig Göransson

Two:
Beck
Lauren Daigle
H.E.R.
Tori Kelly
Dua Lipa
Mark Ronson

Category changes
For the 61st Annual Grammy Awards, multiple category changes are being made;

 In the General Field (which comprises the awards for Record of the Year, Album of the Year, Song of the Year and Best New Artist), the number of nominees in each category was increased from five to eight.
 In the category of Best Compilation Soundtrack for Visual Media, music supervisors will now be eligible.
 The award for Best Surround Sound Album is being renamed Best Immersive Audio Album.

Controversy 
On February 4, 2019, it was reported that American singer Ariana Grande would not be performing at or attending the Grammys, due to a dispute with producer Ken Ehrlich. On February 7, 2019, Grande made a public statement on the matter, she alleged that Ehrlich stifled her creativity and tried to stipulate what song she could perform. She then later went on and alleged that Ehrlich "lied" and she could "pull together a performance over night."

On February 11, 2019, Trinidadian-American rapper Nicki Minaj backed up Grande and alleged Ehrilch "bullied" her. Minaj later said in a statement on Twitter: "I was bullied into staying quiet for 7 years out of fear. But I'll tell my fans the REAL on the next episode of #QueenRadio they deserve the truth."

References

External links
 

 061
2019 in American music
2019 music awards
2019 in Los Angeles
February 2019 events in the United States